is a Japanese manga series written and illustrated by Sanae Kana. It is published in Japan by Softbank.

The series is licensed for an English language release in North America by CMX.

Manga

Reception
Ed Sizemore of Comics Worth Reading criticized the manga for having "no life in these drawings", though he commended the manga for its "nice sense of depth and perspective". ComicMix'''s Andrew Wheeler commented that the manga is more suitable for younger shōjo readers than its supposed shōnen demographic. Michelle Smith of Pop Culture Shock'' called the series "thoroughly mediocre".

References

External links
Official Flex-Comix Classical Medley website 
 Official CMX Classical Medley website

Adventure anime and manga
CMX (comics) titles
2007 manga
Fantasy anime and manga
Shōnen manga
FlexComix Blood and FlexComix Next manga
Webcomics in print